Bactritimimus is a genus of belemnite from the Mississippian Epoch.

Species 
 Bactritimimus girtyi Flower and Gordon 1959
 Bactritimimus ulrichi Flower and Gordon 1959

See also

 Belemnite
 List of belemnites

References

Belemnites
Carboniferous cephalopods
Extinct animals of the United States